A list of films produced in the United Kingdom in 1983 (see 1983 in film):

1983

See also
 1983 in British music
 1983 in British radio
 1983 in British television
 1983 in the United Kingdom

References

External links

1983
Films
Lists of 1983 films by country or language